Culver Line refers to the following transit lines in Brooklyn:
Culver Line (New York City Subway), rapid transit from Downtown Brooklyn to Coney Island, combining the former IND Brooklyn Line and BMT Culver Line
Culver Shuttle, former remnant of the BMT Culver Line
Culver Line (surface), the old surface trolley line on McDonald Avenue, built by the Prospect Park and Coney Island Railroad and essentially replaced by the BMT Culver Line